Bidessonotus is a genus of beetles in the family Dytiscidae, containing the following species:

 Bidessonotus bicolor Guignot, 1957
 Bidessonotus browneanus J.Balfour-Browne, 1947
 Bidessonotus canis K.B.Miller, 1997
 Bidessonotus caraibus (Chevrolat, 1863)
 Bidessonotus championi J.Balfour-Browne, 1947
 Bidessonotus dubius Young, 1990
 Bidessonotus fallax J.Balfour-Browne, 1947
 Bidessonotus inconspicuus (LeConte, 1855)
 Bidessonotus inigmaticus Young, 1990
 Bidessonotus longovalis (Blatchley, 1919)
 Bidessonotus melanocephalus Régimbart, 1895
 Bidessonotus mexicanus Régimbart, 1895
 Bidessonotus mobilis J.Balfour-Browne, 1947
 Bidessonotus morosus J.Balfour-Browne, 1947
 Bidessonotus nepotinus J.Balfour-Browne, 1947
 Bidessonotus obtusatus Régimbart, 1895
 Bidessonotus otrerus Young, 1990
 Bidessonotus paludicolus Young, 1990
 Bidessonotus peregrinus J.Balfour-Browne, 1947
 Bidessonotus pictus Young, 1990
 Bidessonotus ploterus Young, 1990
 Bidessonotus pollostus Young, 1990
 Bidessonotus pulicarius (Aubé, 1838)
 Bidessonotus regimbarti J.Balfour-Browne, 1947
 Bidessonotus rhampherens Young, 1990
 Bidessonotus rubellus Young, 1990
 Bidessonotus sobrinus J.Balfour-Browne, 1947
 Bidessonotus tibialis Régimbart, 1895
 Bidessonotus truncatus J.Balfour-Browne, 1947
 Bidessonotus vicinus J.Balfour-Browne, 1947

References

Dytiscidae genera